Antigua and Barbuda at the 2002 Commonwealth Games was represented by Anguilla Amateur Athletic Association (AAAA) and abbreviated xx.

Antigua and Barbuda was first represented the 1998 Commonwealth Games in Kuala Lumpur. This was Antigua and Barbuda's second Games.

Medals

Athletics
Women's 100 Metres
 Heather Barbara Samuel - 6th in Semi Final 1, 11.56 s

Women's 200 Metres
 Heather Barbara Samuel - Did Not Start in Heat 4

Men's 400 Metres
 Quincy Anthony - 7th in Quarter Final 2, 47.61 s

Women's 800 Metres
 Janill Williams - 5th in Heat 5, 2 mins 11.58 s

Men's Triple Jump
 Ayata Joseph - 11th, 15.15 metres

Antigua and Barbuda at the Commonwealth Games
Nations at the 2002 Commonwealth Games
2002 in Antigua and Barbuda sport